"Good Together" is a song recorded by Canadian country group James Barker Band. The song was co-written by the band's frontman James Barker, along with Gavin Slate and Travis Wood. It was the lead single from the band's second extended play Singles Only, and was nominated for "Single of the Year" at the 2019 CCMA Awards.

Background
Barker stated that the band made a "unanimous decision" to release the song after they listened to the demo he recorded when writing the song with frequent collaborators Gavin Slate and Travis Wood.

Critical reception
Nanci Dagg of Canadian Beats Media referred to the song as a "great dance in your car, foot tapping, let’s just sing-along type of song".

Commercial performance
"Good Together" debuted as the most-added song at Canadian country radio, and the second-most added song at Canadian radio overall. The song reached a peak of number six on Billboard Canada Country chart, becoming the band's fifth straight top ten hit to start their career. It was the most-spun Canadian song on Canadian country radio in 2018, a second consecutive year the band claimed that title following "Chills". The song has been certified Gold by Music Canada.

Charts

Certifications

References

2018 songs
2018 singles
James Barker Band songs
Universal Music Canada singles
Songs written by James Barker (singer)
Songs written by Gavin Slate
Songs written by Travis Wood (songwriter)
Song recordings produced by Todd Clark